The 2013 Portugal Open was a tennis tournament played on outdoor clay courts. It was the 24th edition of the Portugal Open for the men and the 17th for the women, and was part of the ATP World Tour 250 series of the 2013 ATP World Tour, and of the International-level tournaments of the 2013 WTA Tour. Both the men's and the women's events took place at the Estádio Nacional in Oeiras, Portugal, from April 29 through May 5, 2013. Formerly named Estoril Open, the organization of the tournament changed its name to "Portugal Open" in order to recognize Portugal's success in organizing international events.

ATP singles main draw entrants

Seeds

 Rankings are as of April 22, 2013.

Other entrants
The following players received wildcards into the singles main draw:
  Gastão Elias
  David Ferrer
  Pedro Sousa

The following players received entry from the qualifying draw:
  Pablo Carreño
  Niels Desein
  Robin Haase
  Rui Machado

Withdrawals
Before the tournament
  Kevin Anderson
  Juan Martín del Potro (illness)
  Leonardo Mayer
  Juan Mónaco

Retirements
  Gilles Müller (left shoulder injury)

ATP doubles main draw entrants

Seeds

 Rankings are as of April 22, 2013.

Other entrants
The following pairs received wildcards into the doubles main draw:
  Frederico Gil /  Pedro Sousa
  Frederico Ferreira Silva /  Leonardo Tavares
The following pair received entry as alternates:
  Evgeny Donskoy /  Andrey Kuznetsov

Withdrawals
Before the tournament
  Gilles Müller (left shoulder injury)

WTA singles main draw entrants

Seeds

 Rankings are as of April 22, 2013.

Other entrants
The following players received wildcards into the singles main draw:
  Dominika Cibulková
  Julia Görges
  Maria João Koehler
  Svetlana Kuznetsova

The following players received entry from the qualifying draw:
  Estrella Cabeza Candela
  Shahar Pe'er
  Aravane Rezaï
  Galina Voskoboeva

The following player received entry as a lucky loser:
  Monica Puig

Withdrawals
Before the tournament
  Irina-Camelia Begu (right shoulder injury)
  Alizé Cornet (shoulder injury)
  Yaroslava Shvedova
  Roberta Vinci (shoulder injury)
  Heather Watson (mononucleosis)

WTA doubles main draw entrants

Seeds

 Rankings are as of April 22, 2013.

Other entrants
The following pairs received wildcards into the doubles main draw:
  Sofia Araújo /  Joana Valle Costa
  Daria Gavrilova /  Bárbara Luz

Finals

Men's singles

 Stanislas Wawrinka defeated  David Ferrer 6–1, 6–4

Women's singles

 Anastasia Pavlyuchenkova defeated  Carla Suárez Navarro 7–5, 6–2

Men's doubles

  Santiago González /  Scott Lipsky defeated  Aisam-ul-Haq Qureshi /  Jean-Julien Rojer, 6–3, 4–6, [10–7]

Women's doubles

  Chan Hao-ching /  Kristina Mladenovic defeated  Darija Jurak /  Katalin Marosi, 7–6(7–3), 6–2

References

External links
 Official website